The Dull Rose is a Ceylonese (modern-day Sri Lanka) postage stamp that is considered to be the rarest and most valuable stamp issued in the country. 7000 stamps were issued  on 23 April 1859, bearing a face value of four pence. Three others, the 8 pence (chocolate brown), 1 shilling & 9 pence (green), and 2 shilling & 9 pence were issued on the same date as part of a series. These featured a left-facing depiction of a young Queen Victoria in an octagonal framing.

A mint condition original issue Dull Rose was sold for $71,875 at a Cherrystone Philatelic Auction in January 2008. Very few mint condition stamps (about 10) are known to be in existence, valued at £70,000 - £100,000, while used ones are valued at about £4,500.

See also
List of postage stamps

References

Cultural depictions of Queen Victoria
Philately of Sri Lanka
Postal system of Sri Lanka